Panderia is a genus of trilobites in the order Corynexochida.

These nektobenthic carnivores lived in the Ordovician period, from 466.0  to 443.7 Ma.

Species
Panderia baltica
Panderia beaumonti (Rouault 1847)
Panderia derivata
Panderia edita
Panderia erratica
Panderia hadelandica
Panderia insulana
Panderia lerkakensis
Panderia lewisi Salter 1867
Panderia lubrica
Panderia megalophthalma Linnarsson, 1869 (p. 26)
Panderia migratoria
Panderia parvula (Holm 1882)
Panderia ramosa
Panderia triquetra Volborth 1863

Distribution
Fossils of this genus have been found in the Ordovician sediments of Norway, France, Spain, Sweden and United Kingdom.

References 

 Bruton David L., 1968: The trilobite genus Panderia from the Ordovician of Scandinavia and the Baltic areas. Norsk Geologisk Tidsskrift 48(1-2): 1-34

External links
 GeoWiki

Ordovician trilobites
Trilobites of Europe
Illaenina
Corynexochida genera